The 2022 Braga Open was a professional tennis tournament played on clay courts. It was the fourth edition of the tournament which was part of the 2022 ATP Challenger Tour. It took place in Braga, Portugal between 19 and 25 September 2022.

Singles main-draw entrants

Seeds

 1 Rankings are as of 19 September 2022.

Other entrants
The following players received wildcards into the singles main draw:
  Pedro Araújo
  Gonçalo Oliveira
  Duarte Vale

The following players received entry from the qualifying draw:
  Javier Barranco Cosano
  Ugo Blanchet
  Jeremy Jahn
  Pablo Llamas Ruiz
  Imanol López Morillo
  Nicolas Moreno de Alboran

The following player received entry as a lucky loser:
  Duje Ajduković

Champions

Singles
 
  Nicolas Moreno de Alboran def.  Matheus Pucinelli de Almeida 6–2, 6–4.

Doubles

  Vít Kopřiva /  Jaroslav Pospíšil def.  Jeevan Nedunchezhiyan /  Christopher Rungkat 3–6, 6–3, [10–4].

References

2022 ATP Challenger Tour
September 2022 sports events in Portugal
2022 in Portuguese sport